Georgi Adamia (born 10 March 1981) is a former Georgian football forward.

In 2010, he became most capped foreign player in Azerbaijan Premier League.

Career

Club

WIT Georgia
Georgi Adamia started his career in his home country Georgia, in the club FC WIT Georgia. In 2004, the club won the Umaglesi Liga championship.

Neftchi Baku
After this, Adamia was noticed by Azerbaijan champions Neftchi Baku and he was bought by the club. With Neftchi, Adamia won the Azerbaijan Premier League Championship once, and was a runner-up once. He also was a runner up of the CIS Cup in 2005, and the top goalscorer of that competition. In 2006, he helped his side win the CIS Cup.

Career statistics

Club

Honours

Club
WIT Georgia
Umaglesi Liga (1): 2004
Neftchi Baku
Azerbaijan Premier League (1): 2005
CIS Cup (1): 2006

Individual 
CIS Cup top goalscorer: 2005
Azerbaijan Premier League top goalscorer: 2010-11

References

External links 
Profile on Official Neftchi website 

Footballers from Georgia (country)
Living people
1981 births
Azerbaijan Premier League players
Erovnuli Liga players
FC WIT Georgia players
FC Baku players
Qarabağ FK players
Expatriate footballers from Georgia (country)
Expatriate sportspeople from Georgia (country) in Azerbaijan
Expatriate footballers in Azerbaijan
FC Zestafoni players
FC Sioni Bolnisi players
Georgia (country) under-21 international footballers
Association football forwards
Neftçi PFK players